Mário Sérgio Gomes de Souza (born 19 January 1992), known as Mário Sérgio is a Brazilian professional footballer who plays for Penapolense as a defender.

References

External links 
 
 Mario Sérgio at ZeroZero

1992 births
Living people
Association football defenders
Brazilian footballers
Campeonato Brasileiro Série A players
Associação Ferroviária de Esportes players
Club Athletico Paranaense players
Joinville Esporte Clube players